The Iron Cross was a military decoration in the Kingdom of Prussia, German Empire, and Nazi Germany.

Iron Cross also may refer to:

Fictional characters
 Iron Cross, a Marvel Comics character
 Iron Cross, a character in the Aryan Brigade of DC Comics

Film
 The Iron Cross, a 1914 German silent film
 Cross of Iron, a 1977 war film directed by Sam Peckinpah 
 Iron Cross (film), a 2009 British thriller

Gaming
 Close Combat: Cross of Iron, a computer game 
 Hearts of Iron II: Iron Cross a computer game

Music
 Iron Cross (American band), an American punk rock band
 Iron Cross (Burmese band), a rock band in Myanmar 
 Iron Cross, a guitar of Metallica member James Hetfield

Sports
 Iron Cross (exercise), a gymnastics skill
 Cattle catch or iron cross, a type of spinal lock
 Iron Cross (aerial ski trick), an aerial ski trick associated with Jonny Moseley

Other uses
 Iron Cross (Belgium), a combat award of the Kingdom of Belgium
 Iron Cross (secret society), a society at the University of Wisconsin-Madison
 Iron Cross, Warwickshire, a place in England
 Oxalis tetraphylla or Iron Cross, a plant 
 Crois-iarna or iron cross, a kind of hank reel, or wool winder

See also

Cross of Iron (disambiguation)